Natalie Venetia Belcon (born April 5, 1969) is a Trinidadian-born American actress and singer. She is best known for originating the role of former child television star Gary Coleman in the Tony Award-winning Broadway musical Avenue Q. Her other Broadway credits include the role of Joanne Jefferson in Rent and Erzulie in Once on This Island.

Theater 

Belcon performs on the original cast recordings of Avenue Q, The Glorious Ones and The Bubbly Black Girl Sheds Her Chameleon Skin.

She appeared as Columbina in the world premiere of the musical The Glorious Ones (based on the novel of the same name by Francine Prose) at the Pittsburgh Public Theater in 
April 2007. She appeared Off-Broadway in the same role later in 2007, in which a reviewer commented that her "seductive presence is matched by her smoky voice."

Belcon has performed in various productions and workshops of The Last Smoker in America, an original 4 character musical by Bill Russell and Peter Melnick, which received its world premiere at CATCO in Columbus, OH. A workshop production was previously presented in the 2009 New York Musical Theatre Festival. The Last Smoker in America began performances Off-Broadway at the Westside Theatre on July 11, 2012 and closed in September 2012.

Belcon was in Matilda the Musical on Broadway at the Shubert Theatre as Mrs Phelps, replacing Karen Aldridge.

Television
Belcon was last seen in 2007 as an HR Rep in Damages. Before this she was seen in Johnny and the Sprites until its end with her Avenue Q co-star, John Tartaglia. She plays Gwen, the neighbor of Tartaglia's character, Johnny T.

Belcon has also had recurring roles on the television shows The Education of Max Bickford, Beverly Hills, 90210 and Roc. Her most notable guest star appearance came in an episode of The Fresh Prince of Bel Air, as JoAnn Morgan. She also guest starred in episodes of Martin, Living Single, and The Cosby Show.

Personal
Belcon is a 1991 graduate of Carnegie Mellon University.

References

External links
 
 
 Biography from the Avenue Q Web site.
 The Glorious Ones information from the Pittsburgh Public Theater.

American stage actresses
American musical theatre actresses
American television actresses
Carnegie Mellon University College of Fine Arts alumni
Living people
1969 births
Trinidad and Tobago emigrants to the United States